AMD-65 (Hungarian: Automata Módosított Deszant[fegyver] 1965; Automatic Modified Paratrooper [weapon]) is a Hungarian-manufactured licensed variant of the venerable selective fire AKM rifle for use by that nation's armored infantry and paratrooper ("descent") units within the Hungarian Defence Forces. The rifle's design is suited for outdoor use as an infantry rifle but can also be used from within the confines of an armored vehicle as a fire support weapon. This is possible due to the side-folding stock of shaft design that makes it more compact. The 12.6-inch barrel is also relatively short for the 7.62×39mm cartridge. The operating mechanism doesn't require a gas expansion chamber at the muzzle, as in the AKS-74U to ensure reliable functioning, but does use a specially designed muzzle brake. It reduces muzzle flash but makes the weapon louder.

The AMD-65, along with the earlier AKM-63, have been largely replaced in Hungarian military service by the AK-63, a more traditional AKM copy with a lower manufacturing cost.

Features
Compared to the birch plywood laminates that are used on the AKM's buttstock, lower and upper handguard, no wood is used in the manufacture of the AMD-65. The front handguard area is made of perforated sheet metal and typically has a gray plastic vertical foregrip attached to assist in controlling fully automatic fire from this short weapon. In addition, the vertical foregrip has been canted forward to lessen interference with magazine changes. The vertical foregrip is physically identical to the rear grip, with the former mounted backwards with respect to the rear. There are, however, wooden grips available which can serve in place of the common gray plastic version. While these wooden grips are also authentic, in the regular Hungarian army and air force, use of wooden grips is extremely rare.

In Hungarian service, the weapon is mainly used with magazines which can hold 30 rounds (standard magazine) but a special variant (popularly known in the past as "officer's magazine") is also available, which can only hold 20 rounds – an unusual feature in many other countries, who more often use the standard 30-round or 40-round magazines. The weapon is better suited to a 20-round magazine, as it can be locked into the receiver without interfering with the forward handgrip and it is easier to handle the weapon in tight quarters. The 30-round magazine does fit with some slight interference and it can be also fitted with the 40-round magazine.

In theory, the short barrel is stiffer and more inherently accurate, but the poor quality of commonly available ammunition negates this advantage.

AKM-63
Another Hungarian AKM variant was used as Hungary's standard service rifle before being replaced by the AK-63. It is a standard-length AKM variant, with a standard buttstock and full-length barrel. The front sight is in the standard location. However, the front and rear pistol grips and sheet metal handguard are similar to those of the AMD-65.

Modernisation - AMD-65M
During the late 2000s, a modernization program started for the AK-63.

The modernisation included Picatinny rails, new handgrips, underbarrel grenade launcher, new sights, and flashlights.
 CAA CBS+ACP telescopic stock
 Brügger & Thomet BT-21428 gas block
 Side mount (unknown type)
 Heckler & Koch M320 Grenade Launcher Module
 Aimpoint CompM2 sight (B&T BT-21741 QD ring 30 mm ultrahigh heavy type)
 Aimpont 3×Mag sight (B&T BT-211115 Flip-side QD base mount, B&T BT-211113 Flip-side QD ring)
 Insight Technology AN/PEQ-2 Target Pointer/Illuminator/Aiming Light (TPIAL) laser sight
 CAA BP Grip with bipod
 CAA AG47 handgrip

Users

: Used by Cuban forces in Angola, stocks captured and reused by UNITA.
: Used by the Afghan National Police.
 : 1186 rifles were delivered in 2008
 
 : Used by several factions during the Lebanese Civil War, 1975-1990.

 : Used by Royal Moroccan Gendarmerie.
 : Used by FRELIMO and RENAMO forces during the civil war, 1975-1991 
 : Used by National Border Service (SENAFRONT), National Aeronaval Service (SENAN) and Institutional Protection Service (SPI).
 
 
 
 : Sudan People's Liberation Army
 
 : Used by American special forces such as the Army Green Berets in Afghanistan.
 : Used during Vietnam War.

Non-state actors
  Palestine Liberation Organization (PLO)

Former users

Availability in the United States
Many AMD-65s were exported to the United States and sold in kit form following the destruction of the receiver, which legally rendered the weapon to the status of a non-firearm. In order to be legally reassembled, the parts must be rebuilt on a US-made receiver which lacks the provisions for certain parts which would make it capable of automatic fire. In its original short-barreled form the completed weapon is regulated as a "short-barreled rifle" (SBR) under the National Firearms Act in the United States. The addition of a permanently attached barrel extension of the correct length will render the firearm legal for general use, subject to additional stipulations. These include a certain number of US-made parts in the finished rifle. This count is required in order to comply with U.S.C. 922 (r); a statute which regulates imported rifles with certain features that the BATFE defines as not being suitable for sporting purposes. Some individuals choose to build AMD-65s without a buttstock, thus legally classifying the resulting new firearm as a "pistol" and eliminating the need for a muzzle extension (as well as the parts for 922r compliance).

In summary, the semi-automatic version of the AMD-65, when re-manufactured as detailed above, is now legal for civilian use in most states.

Use by foreign military and private security companies
The AMD-65 has been exported to the West Bank and Gaza, as well as in Afghanistan. An increasing number of western security forces, including contract employees of the former private military company Blackwater Worldwide (now known as "Academi") who are serving in the latter two countries, use highly modified AMD-65s rather than conventional 5.56mm based carbines and rifles.

The combination of a larger caliber and shorter size provides better penetration during short range combat. The metal front handguard lends itself well to a relatively easy refit with multiple picatinny rails/MIL-STD-1913 rails, allowing red-dot optics, tactical lights and other accessories to be easily attached then used. The wire buttstock rod can be reshaped to load 75-round RPK drum magazines with ease even with the stock folded, and the weapon's internal mechanism can be tuned with aftermarket recoil dampers for smoother behaviour in full-auto mode.

Gallery

See also
AK-63
AMP-69
IMI Galil
List of assault rifles

References

External links
 The AK site
 Small Arms of the World, 1983
 Description, photos
 True history of AMD-65 from the Hungarian AK site

7.62×39mm assault rifles
Rifles of the Cold War
Hungary–Soviet Union relations
Infantry weapons of the Cold War
Kalashnikov derivatives
Assault rifles of Hungary
Fegyver- és Gépgyár firearms
Military equipment introduced in the 1960s